is a Class A river in Hokkaidō, Japan. It flows through  Hiyama District, and empties into the Sea of Japan.

It is the only Class A river in Southern Hokkaidō, and thus is considered to be extremely important for agriculture and flood control.

The river has been voted the "Cleanest River in Japan" by the Ministry of Land, Infrastructure, Transport and Tourism (MLIT) 10 times between 1987 and 2006.

Geography 
The Shiribeshi-Toshibetsu river originates from the ridge between Mount Taihei and Mount Oshamambe-dake. The river flows through Imakane, Setana. and Kitahiyama, Hokkaido.

Climate 
The basin is located at the northern limit of the temperate climate and is relatively warm due to the influence of the Tsushima Current moving northward across the Sea of Japan.

Origin of name 
The name Shiribeshi-Toshibetsu was formed by adding the word Shiribeshi to distinguish the river from the Toshibetsu River in Tokachi Subprefecture. Shiribeshi was the name of a province which existed between 1869 and 1882. The name Toshibetsu is thought to originate from the Ainu words toshu betsu, meaning 'meandering river', or to ushi betsu, meaning 'river with many marshes'.

References

Rivers of Hokkaido
Rivers of Japan